Nepal–Italy relations refers to foreign relations between Nepal and Italy.

Nepal–Italy relations were officially established on 31 August 1959.

References 

 
Italy
Nepal